Sangat (station code: SGF) is located in Bathinda district in the Indian state of Punjab and serves Sangat town and nearby villages. Sangat mandi is a commercial hub for agricultural produce in the area. Sangat station falls under Bikaner railway division of North Western Railway zone of Indian Railways.

Overview 
This station is located on the single track,  broad gauge, Jodhpur–Bathinda line which was established in 1902.

Electrification 
Sangat railway station is situated on single track electrified Suratgarh–Bathinda line. It was reported in February 2020 that the electrification of the single track BG Suratgarh–Bathinda line was in progress. The station photographs show three electrified tracks.

Amenities 
Sangat railway station has 1 booking windows, no enquiry office and just very basic amenities like drinking water, public toilets, sheltered area with adequate seating etc. The station had small footfall of 228 persons per day in 2018. wheelchair availability was not there for disabled persons. There are two platforms at the station but no foot overbridge (FOB).

References

External links 

 Pictures of Sangat railway station

Railway stations in Bathinda district
Bikaner railway division